Jelonki may refer to the following places:
Jelonki, Masovian Voivodeship (east-central Poland)
Jelonki, Opole Voivodeship (south-west Poland)
Jelonki, Warmian-Masurian Voivodeship (north Poland)
Jelonki, Gryfino County in West Pomeranian Voivodeship (north-west Poland)
Jelonki, Świdwin County in West Pomeranian Voivodeship (north-west Poland)